Searsia tomentosa, the real wild currant (English), umhlakoti (Zulu) or korentebos (Afrikaans), is a small, bushy, evergreen tree that occurs in fynbos and coastal shrub in South Africa. It is naturally most common in forest margins.

The sprays of small greenish flowers emit an unpleasant smell that attracts flies. However it is also an attractive shrub and is grown internationally in botanical gardens for its multi-coloured foliage.

References

tomentosa
Endemic flora of South Africa
Flora of the Cape Provinces
Fynbos
Trees of South Africa